The blackspotted grenadier or blackspot rattail, Lucigadus nigromaculatus, is a rattail, one of seven in the genus Lucigadus. It is found around southern Australia, New Zealand, and Chile, at depths of between 400 and 1,400 m.  This species length is between 15 and 30 cm.

References

 
 
 Tony Ayling & Geoffrey Cox, Collins Guide to the Sea Fishes of New Zealand,  (William Collins Publishers Ltd, Auckland, New Zealand 1982) 

Macrouridae
Fish described in 1907